Guillaume de Bertier de Sauvigny (1912-2004) was a French historian. He was a Professor of Modern and Contemporary History at the Institut Catholique de Paris from 1949 to 1977. He was the recipient of three prizes from the Académie française: the Prix Thiers for Le comte Ferdinand de Bertier et l’énigme de la Congrégation in 1949, the Grand Prix Gobert for La Restauration in 1956, and the Prix Yvan Loiseau for Metternich in 1987.

Works

References

1912 births
2004 deaths
People from Boulogne-sur-Mer
Academic staff of the Institut Catholique de Paris
20th-century French historians